Browning  is a town in Glacier County, Montana, United States. It is the headquarters for the Blackfeet Indian Reservation and the only incorporated town on the Reservation. The population was 1,018 at the 2020 census.

The town was named in 1885 for Commissioner of Indian Affairs Daniel M. Browning. The post office was established in 1895.

Geography

Climate
Browning has a warm-summer humid continental climate (Dfb), bordering on a subarctic climate. From January 23 to January 24, 1916, the temperature fell 100 °F (56 °C), from 44 °F (7 °C) to −56 °F (−49 °C), the world record for greatest temperature drop in 24 hours.
Browning's climate is semi-arid and continental. Temperatures above  occur an average of twice annually, temperatures below  occur an average of 196 days annually, and those below  occur an average of 32 days annually. There is a large degree of diurnal temperature variation that occurs in the summer, but not as much in the winter. Large temperature swings are possible, especially in fall, winter, and spring. Arctic-air intrusions from western Canada can bring sudden, severe temperature drops, while chinook events, with Pacific-originating warmer air descending from mountain ranges to the west, can result in dramatic temperature rises. Precipitation averages just over 14 inches per year, rendering the climate semi-arid. From November to March or April, the precipitation is primarily snow. Average monthly precipitation is lowest in winter and highest in the warm season. On average, June is the wettest month, with showers and thunderstorms most likely among all months.

Demographics

2010 census
As of the census of 2010, there were 1,016 people, 360 households, and 243 families living in the town. The racial makeup of the town was 5.5% White, 92.7% Native American, and 1.8% from two or more races. Hispanic or Latino of any race were 3.7% of the population.

There were 360 households, of which 45.3% had children under the age of 18 living with them, 28.6% were married couples living together, 28.6% had a female householder with no husband present, 10.3% had a male householder with no wife present, and 32.5% were non-families. 27.2% of all households were made up of individuals, and 8% had someone living alone who was 65 years of age or older. The average household size was 2.82 and the average family size was 3.43.

The median age in the town was 29.8 years. 33.1% of residents were under the age of 18; 9.6% were between the ages of 18 and 24; 23.6% were from 25 to 44; 23% were from 45 to 64; and 10.7% were 65 years of age or older. The gender makeup of the town was 46.1% male and 53.9% female.

2000 census

As of the census of 2000, there were 1,065 people, 360 households, and 254 families living in the town. The population density was 3,911.2 people per square mile (1,523.0/km2). There were 409 housing units at an average density of 1,502.0 per square mile (584.9/km2). The racial makeup of the town was 6.57% White, 90.52% Native American, 0.09% from other races, African American, 0.09% and 2.72% from two or more races. Hispanic or Latino of any race were 1.88% of the population.

There were 360 households, out of which 39.2% had children under the age of 18 living with them, 36.7% were married couples living together, 25.3% had a female householder with no husband present, and 29.2% were non-families. 27.2% of all households were made up of individuals, and 8.9% had someone living alone who was 65 years of age or older. The average household size was 2.81 and the average family size was 3.40.

In the town, the population was spread out, with 31.5% under the age of 18, 10.3% from 18 to 24, 28.1% from 25 to 44, 18.1% from 45 to 64, and 12.0% who were 65 years of age or older. The median age was 31 years. For every 100 females, there were 83.0 males. For every 100 females age 18 and over, there were 77.2 males.

The median income for a household in the town was $23,879, and the median income for a family was $25,000. Males had a median income of $24,375 versus $20,972 for females. The per capita income for the town was $8,955. About 28.3% of families and 29.2% of the population were below the poverty line, including 33.4% of those under age 18 and 23.6% of those age 65 or over.

Education
Browning Public Schools educates students from kindergarten through 12th grade. They are known as the Indians. Browning High School is a Class A school.

Browning is home to Blackfeet Community College.

Media
Browning is home to low-power radio station KBWG-LP, broadcasting at 107.5 FM.

Infrastructure

Transportation
 US Route 2 comes into Browning from East Glacier from the west.
 US Route 89 comes into Browning from St. Mary from the north.
The two US Routes meet on the western end of Browning and run through town together, splitting on the eastern end of town, with US 2 headed east towards Cut Bank and Shelby and US 89 headed south towards Choteau and Great Falls.
US Route 87 ran through Browning until 1934, when US 89 replaced its original routing north of Great Falls. US 87 then ended in Great Falls until 1945, when it was changed to run from Great Falls to Havre.
 Amtrak's Chicago to Portland/Seattle Empire Builder serves Browning from October to April at a station just south of town. East Glacier receives passengers just a few miles west, from April to October.

Notable people
Shannon Augare, politician
Michele Binkley, politician
Frosty Boss Ribs, politician
Jackie Larson Bread, beadwork artist
Gladys Cardiff, Native American poet and academic
Elouise Pepion Cobell, MacArthur Grant winner, tribal elder and activist, banker, rancher, and lead plaintiff in Cobell v. Salazar
Lila Walter Evans, politician
Lily Gladstone, actress
Bonnie HeavyRunner, academic
Joe Hipp, professional boxer
Carol Juneau, politician and educator
Denise Juneau, politician
Darrell Kipp, educator, documentary filmmaker, and historian
Terran Last Gun, artist
Stuart Long, popular Roman Catholic priest stationed in Browning for three years
Zahn McClarnon, actor
Earl Old Person, honorary lifetime chief of the Blackfeet Nation
Albert Racine, artist
Steve Reevis, actor known for Dances with Wolves, Geronimo: An American Legend, Fargo, and The Missing
Hart Merriam Schultz, artist
Robert Scriver, sculptor and museum owner
Marvin Weatherwax Jr., politician
James Welch, poet and author
Tyson Running Wolf, member of the Montana House of Representatives
Alfred Young Man, artist, writer, and educator

In popular culture
Browning is the setting for the TV-series The X-Files episode "Shapes".

References

External links

 

Blackfeet Nation
Towns in Glacier County, Montana
Seats of government of American Indian reservations